Jim Guthrie (born September 13, 1961 in Gadsden, Alabama) is a former driver in the Indy Racing League. He debuted in the Indy Racing League in 1996 with moderately successful results. When the IRL moved to purpose-built chassis in 1997, Guthrie was forced to take out a second mortgage to purchase a new chassis. With no sponsorship and the prospects of losing his house if his venture was unsuccessful, he won the second race in the new chassis at Phoenix International Raceway. He got sponsorship from Jacuzzi for the Indianapolis 500 and was able to finish the season (placing 12th in season points) winning Rookie of the Year honors and kept his house. Jim contested four races in 1998, but then during the Indianapolis 500, he was seriously injured in a multi-car crash, but he returned later in the season for two different teams. He attempted the 1999 Indianapolis 500 but failed to qualify his Coulson Racing entry.

Jim was later an owner of Guthrie Meyer Racing in the Firestone Indy Lights Series that fielded a car for his son Sean, who raced in the Star Mazda Series in 2005.  The team began with 2005 IPS driver Travis Gregg at Homestead, and 2005 Star Mazda champion Raphael Matos scoring the team's first two wins at St. Petersburg (there were two races on that weekend).  For the 2008 season, the team had 3 cars with Logan Gomez filling the second seat and the third was run by Tom Wieringa and Robbie Pecorari. Franck Perera joined the team for the second half of the season and captured a win at Infineon Raceway.

Guthrie later started competing in Formula Drift with a Chevrolet powered Mazda RX7 sponsored by Car Crafters of Albuquerque.

On Sept 25th 2012, Jim under-steered, crashed and flipped his 2011 Ford Mustang into a tire wall at Formula Drift/Pro Am Round 4 (After Dark); the result of a driver error.

Today, Guthrie is actively involved in the local community in Albuquerque. His business, Car Crafters, has recently expanded to 5 locations around the Albuquerque area. One of his latest interests is triathlons, as he completed his first Half-Ironman in April 2016 in Monterrey, Mexico.

Racing record

American Open Wheel Racing results
(key)

Indy Racing League

Indianapolis 500

References

1961 births
Atlantic Championship drivers
Indianapolis 500 drivers
IndyCar Series drivers
Living people
Sportspeople from Gadsden, Alabama
Racing drivers from Alabama
Trans-Am Series drivers
U.S. F2000 National Championship drivers